DeWitt C. Coffman (28 November 1854–27 June 1932) was a United States Navy admiral. He served in the Spanish–American War and World War I.

Life and career
Coffman was born at Mount Jackson, Virginia, 28 November 1854. He graduated from the U.S. Naval Academy in 1876.

Coffman served in monitor  during the Spanish–American War, and received the Distinguished Service Medal as Commander, Battleship Force 2, Atlantic Fleet, during World War I.

He retired as Rear Admiral on 28 November 1918, and was advanced to Vice Admiral on the retired list on 21 June 1930. He died at Jamestown, Rhode Island, on 27 June 1932.

Namesakes
U.S. Navy Lieutenant Commander A. S. Snow named Coffman Cove in Alaska after Coffman in 1886.

The U.S. Navy destroyer escort , launched in 1943, was named in Coffmans honor.

Gallery

See also

References

 

1854 births
1932 deaths
People from Mount Jackson, Virginia
Recipients of the Navy Distinguished Service Medal
American military personnel of the Spanish–American War
United States Navy personnel of World War I
United States Naval Academy alumni
United States Navy vice admirals